James Sherman Jett (born December 28, 1970), is a former American football wide receiver and Olympic sprinter who played nine seasons for the Los Angeles/Oakland Raiders from 1993 to 2002, in the National Football League (NFL). He attended college at West Virginia University. He guided the Jefferson High School Cougars of Shenandoah Junction, West Virginia to the state playoffs in 1988.  James also ran for the JHS Cougar's Track Team.

Collegiate career
Jett played college football at West Virginia University where he was a four-year starter at receiver.

Freshman season (1989)
Jett entered the 1989 season as the only true freshman to play on the eventual Gator Bowl team. Jett was one of the targets, along with senior Reggie Rembert, for All-American quarterback Major Harris. Along with receiving, Jett led the Mountaineers as a return specialist. Jett finished the season with only 8 receptions but 179 yards and three touchdowns. He also had a total of 35 returns for 504 yards.

Sophomore season (1990)
Jett entered his sophomore season in 1990 as the leading returning receiver for the Mountaineers, who lost both Rembert and Harris. Jett totaled his best statistical season in his career, recording 31 receptions for 652 yards and 2 touchdowns. He also had a career-low 10 returns for 164 yards.

Junior season (1991)
As a junior, Jett saw his numbers decrease to only 9 receptions for 171 yards and two touchdowns. However, he totaled 45 returns for 619 yards, both career-highs. Jett also had five carries for 28 yards and a pass for 27 yards. He finished the season with 845 all-purpose yards.

Senior season (1992)
In his final collegiate season, James Jett recorded 19 receptions for 382 yards and 4 touchdowns. He also had 35 returns for 333 yards. Jett finished his career against Louisiana Tech, where Jett was on the receiving end of a stadium-record 78-yard touchdown reception.

Jett played in the Japan Bowl All-Star game upon his graduation.

Legacy
James Jett finished his career with 1,384 yards and 11 touchdowns. He also had 125 returns for 1,620 yards, totaling 3,076 career all-purpose yards. His all-purpose yardage was fifth on WVU's all-time career list, while his receiving totals was eighth at the time of his graduation.

Jett was inducted into the West Virginia University Sports Hall of Fame in 2002.

Track and field

 

Jett was also an Olympic sprinter. While at West Virginia University, he was a seven-time All-American in track, finishing fifth at 100 meters in the U.S. Olympic Trials in New Orleans, earning him a spot on the 4 x 100 m relay Olympic team, that won the gold medal in the 1992 Summer Olympics with a time of 38.95 seconds. He also outran eventual Olympic gold medalist Carl Lewis in the 100 meters during prelims to the games.

Jett ran the first two rounds of the 4 x 100 m relay in Barcelona, then gave his spot in the finals to Carl Lewis. All team members earned a gold medal. Jett earned NCAA indoor and outdoor All-America honors in the 50 meters, 100 meters and 200 meters during his career and finished as NCAA runner-up at 100 meters and 200 meters in 1992.

His personal bests are 10.10 seconds in the 100 meters and 19.91 seconds in the 200 meters.

Personal bests

Professional career

1993–1995
James Jett signed with the Los Angeles Raiders as an undrafted free agent following the 1993 NFL Draft.

During his rookie season, Jett lead the NFL with over 23 yards per reception and also recorded 771 yards on 33 receptions for 3 touchdowns. Jett averaged 48.2 yards per game his debut season, played in all 16 games but only starting one.

In the 1994 season, Jett played in all 16 games, only starting one, again. However, he only recorded 15 receptions for 253 yards (16.9 yards per reception). In 1995, Jett played in all the games on the season but did not start any contests. He finished the season with 13 receptions for 179 yards and a touchdown.

1996–1998
In 1996, Jett finally started all 16 games on the year. At age 26, he recorded 43 receptions for 601 yards and 4 touchdowns. Jett won the NFL Fastest Man Competition following the season.

The following season, he was second among NFL receivers with a personal-best 12 touchdowns in 1997. Jett finished with a career-high 46 receptions for 804 yards. Jett was a finalist in the NFL Fastest Man Competition after winning the competition the previous season.

In the 1998 season, Jett recorded a career-high 882 yards on 45 receptions for 6 touchdowns. He also tallied a career-high 55 yards per game in his final season of starting all 16 games.

1999–2002
At 29 years old, in 1999, Jett recorded 552 yards on 39 receptions for 2 touchdowns. The following year, 2000, he finished with 20 receptions for 356 yards and 2 touchdowns, including a career-long 84-yard reception against the Atlanta Falcons.

In 2001, at the age of 31 years, Jett played in 11 games on the season, recording two receptions for 19 yards. In his final professional season, 2002, the 32-year-old played in and started only one game, but did not record a statistic.

Legacy
James Jett finished his career with 256 receptions for 4,417 yards and 30 touchdowns, a 17.3 yard per reception average. Jett finished his career as the 8th-leading receiver in Oakland Raiders team history. He was one of two Los Angeles Raiders to remain with the team through Super Bowl XXXVII (the other being fellow wide receiver Tim Brown).

References

External links
 https://web.archive.org/web/20121026075038/http://www.sports-reference.com/olympics/athletes/je/james-jett-1.html
 https://www.pro-football-reference.com/players/J/JettJa00.htm

1970 births
Living people
People from Charles Town, West Virginia
African-American players of American football
American football wide receivers
West Virginia Mountaineers football players
Los Angeles Raiders players
Oakland Raiders players
Olympic gold medalists for the United States in track and field
Athletes (track and field) at the 1992 Summer Olympics
Players of American football from West Virginia
Track and field athletes from West Virginia
Medalists at the 1992 Summer Olympics
American male sprinters
Track and field athletes in the National Football League
21st-century African-American sportspeople
20th-century African-American sportspeople